Donya may refer to:

People
 Donya (name)
 Donya, a diminutive of the Russian male first name Avdon

Other uses
 Donya, an Iranian theoretical magazine in the 1930s
 Donya (album), by Arash, 2008
 Donya (film), 2003 
 Dunya, or donya, an Arabic word that means the temporal world

See also

Donia (disambiguation)
Donka (disambiguation)
Dunya (disambiguation)
Dunia (disambiguation)
Doña, an honorific title
Donyo